Poinsett State Park is located in Sumter County in the U.S. state of South Carolina. The park is best known for its botanical oddities, combining the flora of the Blue Ridge Mountains foothills and Piedmont of Upstate South Carolina, the xeric Sandhills and the Atlantic coastal plain. In Poinsett State Park one can see mountain laurels draped with Spanish moss. The park, which has been called "weird and beautiful", is named after amateur botanist and South Carolina native Joel Roberts Poinsett, the first American ambassador to Mexico and popularizer of the poinsettia. There is a $3 charge for admission to Poinsett State Park and there are small fees for overnight camping and cabin rentals. The park is surrounded by the Manchester State Forest, and both provide access to the Palmetto Trail, linked hiking and mountain bike trails, and Manchester State Forest offers equestrian trails.

History
Located on the High Hills of Santee and descending to the Wateree Swamp, the site was used by various Siouan tribes of Native Americans, including the Santee, Wateree and Catawba, primarily for hunting. The non-Siouan Congaree lived nearby and may have also frequented the area.

Before the American Revolution, the land was owned by a man named Levi, who built a dam to impound water for rice cultivation. Levi's Mill Pond was later used to power a mill. Remnants of the mill are still present, and the pond, improved by the Civilian Conservation Corps, is now known as Old Levi Mill Pond. In 1813 and 1814 the land was deeded to two members of the Singleton family, who owned many plantations in Sumter County. The best remembered Singleton today, Angelica Singleton Van Buren, was First Lady of the United States.

Sumter County donated  for the park, which opened to the public in 1936. Many buildings still in use at the park were built by the Civilian Conservation Corps from locally quarried coquina rock. Coquina is a young limestone in which fossil seashells are still readily apparent. Poinsett State Park was the first of many parks built by the CCC in South Carolina. During the days of racial segregation, the nearby state park for blacks was Mill Creek Group Camp. The park was closed in 1963 for a year, along with all of South Carolina's state parks, due to a Federal court order to desegregate the parks, and it wasn't until 1966 that all its facilities were reopened.  The park's historical elements were listed on the National Register of Historic Places in 2016.

Fauna and flora
Surveys have found 337 species of flowering plants within the park, including 65 species of trees and shrubs. Tree species include mountain laurel (Kalmia latifolia), white oak (Quercus alba), black oak (Q. velutina), turkey oak (Q. laevis), water oak (Q. nigra), pignut hickory (Carya glabra),  loblolly pine (Pinus taeda), longleaf pine (P. palustris), flowering dogwood (Cornus florida), wax myrtle (Morella cerifera), American holly (Ilex opaca), sweetgum (Liquidambar styraciflua), baldcypress (Taxodium distichum), swamp gum (Nyssa biflora), water tupelo (N. aquatica), and red maple (Acer rubrum).

Many species of animals can be found in the park, including copperhead snakes (Agkistrodon contortrix), cottonmouth snakes (A. piscivorus), American alligators (Alligator mississippiensis), and bobcats (Lynx rufus), but these are rarely observed. Animals more typically encountered by visitors include golden silk orb-weaver spiders (Nephila clavipes), largemouth bass (Micropterus salmoides), bullfrogs (Rana catesbeiana), river frogs (Rana heckscheri), spring peeper treefrogs (Pseudacris crucifer), Carolina anole lizards (Anolis carolinensis), five-lined skinks (Eumeces fasciatus), yellow-bellied slider turtles (Trachemys scripta scripta), banded watersnakes (Nerodia fasciata), coachwhip snakes (Masticophis flagellum), eastern hognose snakes (Heterodon platirhinos), Rafinesque's big-eared bats (Corynorhinus rafinesquii), great egrets (Ardea alba), wood ducks (Aix sponsa), turkey vultures (Cathartes aura), red-tailed hawks (Buteo jamaicensis), belted kingfishers (Ceryle alcyon), red-bellied woodpeckers (Melanerpes carolinus), blue-gray gnatcatchers (Polioptila caerulea), and prothonotary warblers (Protonotaria citrea).

See also
National Register of Historic Places listings in Sumter County, South Carolina

References

External links
Official page

State parks of South Carolina
Civilian Conservation Corps in South Carolina
Protected areas of Sumter County, South Carolina
Historic districts on the National Register of Historic Places in South Carolina
Parks on the National Register of Historic Places in South Carolina
National Register of Historic Places in Sumter County, South Carolina
National Park Service Rustic architecture